Established in 1965, Central Department of Chemistry, Tribhuvan University is one of the first science departments that has been commenced by Tribhuvan University as a branch of Tri-Chandra Campus for the beginning of an advanced course of Science in Nepal,  which only provided the course in Organic Chemistry then.

Introduction
The chemistry department continues growing and extending its scope, currently enrolling the students for Masters of  Chemistry degree, and as the chief authority also conducting entrance examinations, enrolling students, and running research activities. It is a leader and pioneer in many interdisciplinary subjects and variations of chemistry throughout the country, running with an affiliation. It has extended to branches at Bharatpur, Biratnagar, Pokhara, Tri-Chandra College and recently at ASCOL.

History
Tribhuvan University was established by promulgating the Tribhuvan University Act in 1959. TU has commenced teaching, research, and other academic activities from July 14, 1959. The teaching of chemistry in Nepal, however, had already commenced in 1921 in Tri-Chandra College, with the introduction of the Intermediate of Science (I.Sc.) program. It was then upgraded to Bachelor of Science (B.Sc.) level in 1947. Master's degree in chemistry was started only from November 28, 1965, initially at Tri-Chandra College with the introduction of a program in organic chemistry. The program was conducted under the lecturer-in-Charge-ship of Late Professor Prasanna Man Singh Pradhan, the then head of the Chemistry Department of Tri-Chandra College. This historical step also pioneered the introduction of research initiatives in chemistry in Nepal.

The present chemistry building within the university campus was constructed on August 17, 1966, and inaugurated on July 16, 1967. The Central Department of Chemistry then started to function in its own building at the university complex.

Master's degree programs in inorganic chemistry and physical chemistry were introduced in 1966 and 1967, respectively. Late Professor Dr. Dhruba Man Singh Amatya was formally appointed as the first head of the department in 1966 and he remained to that post up to 1984. After him, Prof. Dr. S.P. Dhoubadel (1984/10/28 - 1984/11/25), Prof. Dr. C.L. Gajurel (1984/11/26 - 1985/08/31 and 1987/04/11 - 1987/11/05), Prof. J.K. Shrestha (1985/09/01 - 1987/03/31 and 1987/11/06 - 1994/06/05), Prof. Dr. M.D. Manandhar (19894/06/06 - 2002/06/01), Prof. Dr. R.R. Pradhananga (2002/06/06 - 2007/12/12), and Prof. Dr. T.P. Pathak (2007/12/13 - 2009/08/31) were appointed as head of the Central Department of Chemistry during the period in between 1984 and 2009, Prof. Dr. Kedar Nath Ghimire, Prof. Dr. Megh Raj Pokhrel, and Prof. Dr. Ram Chandra Basnyat (biochemist and vegan) have been leading the department as the head since 2018.

Since the establishment, the department has extended its courses on various subjects with amendments each year. The latest being Biochemistry, Natural Product Chemistry, Electrochemistry, Nanotechnology, Polymer science, etc. Since 2013, the department has adopted a semester system that previously succeeded by year basis as major campuses here in Nepal do such.
The total quota of students for each year was 90 and after being converted to the semester system, the quota has been limited to 45 per semester effectively maintaining the identical seats over the year.

Guest Professors and Part-Time Teaching Staff
Professor Jaya Krishna Shrestha (Coordination Chemistry), Professor Dr. Mina Rajbhandari (Organic Chemistry).

Administrative staffs
The list of administrative staffs are as follows:
1.Mr. Mukunda Lal Shresth
2.Mr. Shankar B. Kunwar
3.Mr. Taradatta Joshi
4.Ms. Sarita Bist
5.Mr. Deepak Adhikari
6.Mrs. Geeta Lamichane
7.Mr. Pradip Poudel
8. Nirmala Poudel
9.Ms. Laxmi Rimal
10.Mr. Namshanti Maharjan
11.Ms. Sunita Rimal
12.Ms. Bimala Lama
13. Mr. Sujit Pode Dyola
14. Mr. Basant Pode

Teaching
Courses offered for a Ph.D. and master's degree in chemistry (M.Sc.) in the Central Department of Chemistry are of semesters system. The total credit hours in theory and laboratory work in M.Sc. are 60. During the third semester, students may choose an area of specialization in one of the three separate streams: Physical Chemistry, Organic Chemistry, and Inorganic Chemistry while in the first and second semesters all students are in one general stream. The third-semester students may choose one of the following papers as elective subjects: Spectroscopy, Nuclear Chemistry, Natural Product Chemistry, Biochemistry and Food Chemistry. In the context of emerging new developments in Chemistry, the Department is doing homework in introducing more courses as electives in the future.
Candidates seeking admission to the M.Sc. degree must hold a B.Sc. degree with a major in chemistry from Tribhuvan University (TU) or an equivalent degree from the universities recognized by the TU. They must be qualified in the entrance test conducted by the department. Candidates seeking to admit in the Ph.D. program must have an M.Sc. degree in chemistry from TU or an equivalent degree from the university recognized by the TU.

Research
The department is engaged in research and development activities in various fields of chemistry and biochemistry. The different areas of research covered are as follows:
Applied Enzymology and Biotechnology, Chemistry of Clay Minerals, Corrosion and Surface Science, Electrochemistry/Electrodes
Environmental Chemistry, Natural Products Chemistry, Natural and Synthetic Zeolites, Organic Sulfur Chemistry, Polymer and Materials Chemistry, Reaction Mechanisms, Separation Chemistry & Technology Synthetic Chemistry
 
Services of modern sophisticated instruments currently available at the department are as follows:
Proton-Nuclear Magnetic Resonance Spectrometer, 60  MHz (P-NMR), Fourier Transform Infrared Absorption Spectrometer, Gas-Liquid Chromatography, High-Performance Liquid Chromatography, Planar Chromatography, Atomic Absorption Spectrophotometer, Differential Thermal Analysis and Thermogravimetry (DTA-TG), XFS Spectrometer, UV-VIS Spectrometer, Medium Pressure Liquid Chromatograph, Potentiostat/Galvanostat, Fluorimeter, Polarimeter, Flame Photometer, Polarizing Optical Microscope.

ChemSA
The students of this Department have an association named Chemistry Students’ Association (CHEMSA). This association is involved in extracurricular activities for the welfare of Chemistry students and publishes an annual science magazine “Spectrum”. The ChemSA organized Tree Plantation Program in the Department Premise and constructed the fence around the Department Building collecting the donation from University authority as well as the Department's academic staff.

PhD and M.Sc. dissertations
The research works in the department are conducted basically in the frame of M.Sc. and Ph.D. dissertations. The funding for the research works are generated by different projects, departmental budget as well as personal efforts of academic staff and students. The academic staffs of the department have strong ties with the scientists from renowned international laboratories which have facilitated high level collaborative research works.

References

Chemistry education
Tribhuvan University
1965 establishments in Nepal